Shelley v. Kraemer, 334 U.S. 1 (1948), is a landmark United States Supreme Court case that held that racially restrictive housing covenants cannot legally be enforced.

The case arose after an African-American family purchased a house in St. Louis that was subject to a restrictive covenant preventing "people of the Negro or Mongolian Race" from occupying the property. The purchase was challenged in court by a neighboring resident and was blocked by the Supreme Court of Missouri before going to the U.S. Supreme Court on appeal.

In an opinion joined in by all participating justices, U.S. Supreme Court Chief Justice Fred Vinson held that the Fourteenth Amendment's Equal Protection Clause prohibits racially restrictive housing covenants from being enforced. Vinson held that while private parties could abide by the terms of a racially restrictive covenant, judicial enforcement of the covenant by a court qualified as a state action and was thus prohibited by the Equal Protection Clause.

Facts
In 1945, an African-American family by the name of Shelley purchased a house in St. Louis, Missouri. At the time of purchase, they were unaware that a restrictive covenant had been in place on the property since 1911. The restrictive covenant prevented "people of the Negro or Mongolian Race" from occupying the property. Louis Kraemer, who lived ten blocks away, sued to prevent the Shelleys from gaining possession of the property. The Supreme Court of Missouri held that the covenant was enforceable against the purchasers because the covenant was a purely private agreement between its original parties. As such, it "ran with the land" and was enforceable against subsequent owners. Moreover, since it ran in favor of an estate rather than merely a person, it could be enforced against a third party. A similar scenario occurred in the companion case McGhee v. Sipes from Detroit, Michigan, where the McGhees purchased property that was subject to a similar restrictive covenant. In that case, the Supreme Court of Michigan also held the covenants enforceable.

The Supreme Court consolidated Shelley v. Kraemer and McGhee v. Sipes cases for oral arguments and considered two questions:

 Are race-based restrictive covenants legal under the Fourteenth Amendment of the United States Constitution?
 Can they be enforced by a court of law?

Legal representation
George L. Vaughn was a black attorney who represented J. D. Shelley at the Supreme Court of the United States. The attorneys who argued the case for the McGhees were Thurgood Marshall and Loren Miller. The United States Solicitor General, Philip Perlman, who argued in this case that the restrictive covenants were unconstitutional, had previously in 1925 as the city solicitor of Baltimore acted to support the city government's segregation efforts.

Solicitor General's brief
The U.S. Office of the Solicitor General filed, for the first time in a civil rights case, an amicus curiae ("friend of the court") brief in support of the Shelleys. The Solicitor General's brief filed on behalf of the United States government was written by four Jewish lawyers: Philip Elman, Oscar H. Davis, Hilbert P. Zarky, and Stanley M. Silverberg. However, the Solicitor General's office chose to omit their names from the brief. Deputy Solicitor General Arnold Raum, who was also Jewish, stated that it was "bad enough that [Solicitor General Philip] Perlman's name has to be there, to have one Jew's name on it, but you have also put four more Jewish names on. That makes it look as if a bunch of Jewish lawyers in the Department of Justice put this out."

Decision
On May 3, 1948, the Supreme Court issued a unanimous 6–0 decision in favor of the Shelleys. The Supreme Court held "that the [racially] restrictive agreements, standing alone, cannot be regarded as violative of any rights guaranteed to petitioners by the Fourteenth Amendment." Private parties might abide by the terms of such a restrictive covenant, but they might not seek judicial enforcement of such a covenant, as that would be a state action. Because such state action would be discriminatory, the enforcement of a racially based restrictive covenant in a state court would therefore violate the Equal Protection Clause of the Fourteenth Amendment to the United States Constitution.

The court rejected the argument that since state courts would enforce a restrictive covenant against white people, judicial enforcement of restrictive covenants would not violate the Equal Protection Clause. The court noted that the Fourteenth Amendment guarantees individual rights, and that equal protection of the law is not achieved by the imposition of inequalities:

Companion cases
Hurd v. Hodge and Urciolo v. Hodge were companion cases from the District of Columbia. The Equal Protection Clause does not explicitly apply to a U.S. territory not in a U.S. state, but the Court found that both the Civil Rights Act of 1866 and treating persons in the District of Columbia like those in the states forbade restrictive covenants.

Later legislation
In 1968 Congress enacted the Fair Housing Act, which voided racially-discriminatory covenants in housing and made them illegal.

In popular culture
In 2010, Jeffrey S. Copeland published Olivia's Story: The Conspiracy of Heroes Behind Shelley v. Kraemer, a literary nonfiction account of events leading up to the Shelley v. Kraemer case. In 2017, a documentary film was made titled The Story of Shelley v. Kraemer. The script for the film was written by Copeland, and it was produced by Joe Marchesani and Laney Kraus-Taddeo of the Audio/Video Production Services division of Educational Technology and Media Services at the University of Northern Iowa (Cedar Falls, Iowa). The film has been a featured part of the exhibit titled "#1 in Civil Rights: The African American Freedom Struggle in St. Louis", at the Missouri History Museum in St. Louis. The film was also nominated for the Sundance Film Festival.

See also
List of United States Supreme Court cases, volume 334
Shelley House (St. Louis, Missouri), a National Historic Landmark
Buchanan v. Warley (1917), a U.S. Supreme Court case which overturned racial zoning ordinances
Corrigan v. Buckley (1926), a U.S. Supreme Court case which upheld racially restrictive covenants
Hansberry v. Lee (1940), a U.S. Supreme Court case which allowed renewed challenges to racial covenants
Civil Rights Act of 1968, of which Titles VIII–IX prohibit discrimination in housing for multiple reasons
Noble v. Alley, a similar case decided by the Supreme Court of Canada in 1951

References

Sources

External links
 
 
"Orsel McGhee House", A Michigan State Historic Site. Detroit: The History and Future of the Motor City website. Accessed 26 March 2014.
 

Covenant (law)
United States equal protection case law
United States Supreme Court cases
United States land use case law
Legal history of Missouri
20th-century American trials
1948 in United States case law
1948 in Missouri
American Civil Liberties Union litigation
Housing rights activism
African-American history between emancipation and the civil rights movement
United States Supreme Court cases of the Vinson Court
Civil rights movement case law
Housing in Missouri
African-American history in St. Louis
United States racial discrimination case law
Thurgood Marshall